Bergaris flora is a moth in the family Cossidae. It was described by Yakovlev in 2006. It is found on Flores and Sumba.

The length of the forewings is 24–28 mm. The forewings are light-brown with a streaky pattern and a brown margin. The hindwings are uniform brown.

References

Natural History Museum Lepidoptera generic names catalog

Zeuzerinae
Moths described in 2006